The second and final season of The Four: Battle for Stardom premiered on Fox on June 7, 2018. Fergie hosted the show, while Sean Combs, DJ Khaled and Meghan Trainor were judges. On August 2, 2018, the winner was announced as  James Graham from Chelmsford, United Kingdom.

As of October 2020, Fox has not yet made an announcement regarding season 3.

The Four

Key:
 – Challenger against "The Four" won and secured a seat as a new member.
 – Member of "The Four" did not perform.
 – Member of "The Four" won the challenge and secured their seat.
 – Member of "The Four" lost the challenge and was eliminated.
 – Challenger to "The Four" lost their challenge and was eliminated.
 – An eliminated artist who was chosen to return to the competition via #TheFourComeback earned a chance to challenge "The Four" 
 – Artist was chosen to return to the show, but lost their opportunity to challenge one of "The Four" when another comeback artist defeated them.
 – Not in the competition.
 – Final member of “The Four”
* – Original member of "The Four"

Challenge Episodes
Key:
 – Artist secured a spot and has remained in "The Four".
 – Artist won their challenge, but was eventually eliminated from the competition.
 – Artist was eliminated from the competition.
 – Artist lost their challenge, and was originally eliminated, but received a second chance via #TheFourComeback.

Week 1 (June 7)
Before the competition began, each original member of The Four performed a solo song.

Note : Sharaya J & James Graham Were also the final two.

Week 2 (June 14)
Group performance: "All the Stars"

Week 3 (June 21)
Group performance: "Believer"
Note: This is the first time that all four members have been challenged this season and this is the first time on The Four that all four members have defended their seats.

Week 4 (June 28)
Group performance: "The Way I Are" (with Timbaland)

Week 5 (July 12)
Group performance: "Can't Feel My Face"

Week 6 (July 19)
Group performance: "24K Magic

Comeback Performances

Week 7 (July 26)
Similar to last season, America voted on which of the eliminated contestants they wanted to return to the competition by tweeting the hashtag #TheFourComeback and the hashtag of the contestant’s name. However, this season, people who challenged The Four and lost were also eligible in addition to previous members. On July 23, @TheFourOnFox (via Instagram) posted pictures which announced that Carvena Jones, Dylan Jacob, Ebon Lurks, James Graham, Jesse Kramer, Lil Bri, Stephanie Zelaya, and Whitney Reign were the top eight vote-getters, and will be returning to the competition.

Part 1: Head-To-Head Battles
Group Performance: "I Want You Back" (featuring Evvie McKinney and Zhavia)
During the first part of the competition, the comeback artists split into pairs and performed for the favor of the audience. The audience selected one from each pair to immediately challenge one of the members of "The Four"

Part 2: Comeback Artist Challenge Performances 

After winning their Head-to-Head battles, the four comeback artists each immediately challenged a member of "The Four" for an opportunity to claim a seat. This time, the judges decided who would advance to the finale instead of the audience.

Finale

Week 8 (August 2)
Group performance: "Hard"

Part 1: Head-to-Head Battles
In Part 1, the finalists each performed two songs. For the first song, each finalist performed in hopes of winning over the audience. After performing, the audience voted on their favorite performance, and the finalist with the most votes earned the power to choose who they wanted to battle against in the head-to-head challenge. For their second song, each selected pair went head-to-head. The judges picked a winner from each pair to move on to the final battle.

Part 2: The Final Battle
For the final battle, the two finalists performed once more for the votes of the judges. The winner of this battle would be crowned the winner of The Four.

Artists who appeared on previous shows

 James Graham was a member of the band Stereo Kicks which finished fifth on The X Factor during the eleventh season in 2014. 
 Carvena Jones auditioned for the ninth season of American Idol but was cut in Hollywood week.
 Chris Vanny appeared on the second season of La Banda under the name Christian Castro. He was one of the five winners who were put together to form the winning band, MIX5.
 Christina Castle competed on the third season of The X Factor Australia under her real name, Christina Parie. She finished in sixth place.
 Skylar Dayne turned no chairs on the sixth season of The Voice and auditioned contestant on Idol Kids Puerto Rico, but was cut in the semi-finals.
 Ali Caldwell was a contestant on the eleventh season of The Voice on Team Miley Cyrus finishing in 5th place.
Lil Bri appeared on the fourth season of Lifetime’s The Rap Game finishing in second place.

Ratings

References

2018 American television seasons